General elections were held in the Netherlands on 6 September 1989. The Christian Democratic Appeal (CDA) remained the largest party, winning 54 of the 150 seats in the House of Representatives. This chamber served for 4 years and 7 months, the longest tenure of any modern Dutch parliament.

The Centre Democrats party of Hans Janmaat won a seat.

Following the elections, the CDA formed a coalition government with the Labour Party with the CDA's Ruud Lubbers continuing as Prime Minister.

Results

By province

References

General elections in the Netherlands
Netherlands
1989 elections in the Netherlands
1989 in the Netherlands
September 1989 events in Europe